Jutøya AS is a passenger ferry company that operates services from Tenvik in Nøtterøy and Engø in Sandefjord to the island of Veierland. The company was founded in 2000, and operates the ferry MF Jutøya on contract with Vestviken Kollektivtrafikk.

References

Ferry companies of Vestfold og Telemark
Transport companies established in 2000